"Feels Good" is the title of a number-one R&B single by Tony! Toni! Toné! featuring a rap verse by Mopreme Shakur. The hit song spent two weeks at number one on the U.S. R&B chart. It was also their first top-ten hit on the U.S. Billboard Hot 100, peaking at number nine.  "Feels Good" also peaked at number three on the dance charts.

Sampling
The song samples Think (About It). Two turntables were used in the process. One which plays the break in reverse and can be heard in the left ear. The other plays the break normally and can be heard in the right ear.

Track listings
US Cassette Single
A1 Feels Good [12" Party Mix]  8:30
B1 Previews: Oakland Stroke / It Never Rains (In Southern California) / The Blues 1:30
B2 Feels Good [Instrumental]  5:20

US 12" Single

Side 1:
 Feels Good [Edit] 4:31
 Feels Good [LP Version] 4:53
 Feels Good [12" Party Mix] 8:27

Side 2:
 Feels Good [Extended Version] 6:56

US Maxi-CD
 Feels Good [Radio Version] 4:33
 Feels Good [LP Version]  4:56
 Feels Good [12" Party Mix]  8:30
 Feels Good [Extended Mix]  6:56

Canada 12" Promo
A1 Feels Good [Ben Liebrand House Mix]  6:56
A2 Feels Good [Ben Liebrand House Edit]  4:19
B1 My Christmas [Yuletide Mix]  5:33
B2 My Christmas [Cool Cut Mix]  4:45
B3 My Christmas [The Other Mix]  5:14

Charts

Weekly charts

Year-end charts

Other media
The chorus of the song can be heard at the end of a 2011 Ford Edge commercial. The song was also heard and used in Rick and Morty'''s season 2 episode "Look Who's Purging Now," as well as in the Doogie Howser, M.D. season 2 episode "Dances with Wanda," a late 1990 episode of the US daytime soap opera Days of Our Lives, and in the 2007 movie Trick 'r Treat''.

References

External links
[ Song review] on Allmusic

See also
R&B number-one hits of 1990 (USA)

1990 singles
1990 songs
New jack swing songs
Songs written by D'wayne Wiggins
Songs written by Raphael Saadiq
Tony! Toni! Toné! songs
Wing Records singles